Patrik Larsson (born 21 December 1970) is a retired Swedish football midfielder.

References

1968 births
Living people
Swedish footballers
BK Olympic players
Trelleborgs FF players
IFK Malmö Fotboll players
Association football midfielders
Allsvenskan players